Rimini is a city in the Emilia-Romagna region of northern Italy and capital city of the Province of Rimini. It sprawls along the Adriatic Sea, on the coast between the rivers Marecchia (the ancient Ariminus) and Ausa (ancient Aprusa). It is one of the most notable seaside resorts in Europe with revenue from both internal and international tourism forming a significant portion of the city's economy. It is also near San Marino, a small nation within Italy. The first bathing establishment opened in 1843. Rimini is an art city with ancient Roman and Renaissance monuments, and is also the birthplace of the film director Federico Fellini.

The city was founded by the Romans in 268 BC. Throughout Roman times, Rimini was a key communications link between the north and south of the peninsula. On its soil, Roman emperors erected monuments such as the Arch of Augustus and the Tiberius Bridge to mark the beginning and the end of the Decumanus of Rimini. During the Renaissance, the city benefited from the court of the House of Malatesta, which hosted artists like Leonardo da Vinci and produced works such as the Tempio Malatestiano. The main monuments in Rimini are the Tiberius Bridge and the Arch of Augustus.

In the 19th century, Rimini was one of the most active cities on the revolutionary front, hosting many of the movements seeking to achieve Italian unification. In the course of World War II, the city was the scene of numerous clashes and bombings, but also of a fierce partisan resistance that earned it the honour of a gold medal for civic valour. In recent years it has become one of the most important sites for trade fairs and conferences in Italy.

As of 31 December 2019, Rimini's urban area was home to 151,200 people, with approximately 325,000 living in the eponymous province, making it the twenty-eighth largest city in Italy. The city is located near the independent republic of San Marino and the Misano race track.

History

Ancient history 

The area was inhabited by Etruscans until the arrival of the Celts, who held it from the 6th century BC until their defeat by the Umbri in 283 BC. In 268 BC at the mouth of the Ariminus (now called the Marecchia), the Roman Republic founded the colonia of Ariminum.

Ariminum was seen as a bastion against invaders from Celts and also as a springboard for conquering the Padana plain. The city was involved in the civil wars of the first century, aligned with the popular party and its leaders, first Gaius Marius, and then Julius Caesar. After crossing the Rubicon, the latter made his legendary appeal to the legions in the Forum of Rimini.

As the terminus of the Via Flaminia, which ended in the town at the surviving prestigious Arch of Augustus (erected 27 BC), Rimini was a road junction connecting central and northern Italy by the Via Aemilia that led to Piacenza and the Via Popilia that extended northwards; it also opened up trade by sea and river. 

Remains of the amphitheatre that could seat 12,000 people, and a five-arched bridge of Istrian stone completed by Tiberius (21 AD), are still visible. Later Galla Placidia built the church of Santo Stefano. 

The evidence that Rimini is of Roman origins is illustrated by the city being divided by two main streets, the Cardo and the Decumanus.

The end of Roman rule was marked by destruction caused by invasions and wars, but also by the establishment of the palaces of the Imperial officers and the first churches, the symbol of the spread of Christianity that held the important Council of Ariminum in the city in 359.

Middle Ages 

When the Ostrogoths conquered Rimini in 493, Odoacer, besieged in Ravenna, had to capitulate. During the Gothic War (535–554), Rimini was taken and retaken many times. In its vicinity the Byzantine general Narses overthrew (553) the Alamanni. Under the Byzantine rule, it belonged to the Duchy of the Pentapolis, part of the Exarchate of Ravenna.

In 728, it was taken with many other cities by Liutprand, King of the Lombards but returned to the Byzantines about 735. Pepin the Short gave it to the Holy See, but during the wars of the popes and the Italian cities against the emperors, Rimini sided with the latter.

In the 13th century, it suffered from the discords of the Gambacari and Ansidei families. The city became a municipality in the 14th century, and with the arrival of the religious orders, numerous convents and churches were built, providing work for many illustrious artists. In fact, Giotto inspired the 14th-century School of Rimini, which was the expression of original cultural ferment.

The House of Malatesta emerged from the struggles between municipal factions with Malatesta da Verucchio, who in 1239 was named podestà (chief magistrate) of the city. Despite interruptions, his family held authority until 1528. In 1312 he was succeeded by Malatestino Malatesta, first signore (lord) of the city and Pandolfo I Malatesta, the latter's brother, named by Louis IV, Holy Roman Emperor, as imperial vicar of Romagna. 

Ferrantino, son of Malatesta II (1335), was opposed by his cousin Ramberto and by Cardinal Bertrand du Pouget (1331), legate of Pope John XXII. Malatesta II was also lord of Pesaro. He was succeeded by Malatesta Ungaro (1373) and Galeotto I Malatesta, uncle of the former (1385), lord also of Fano (from 1340), Pesaro, and Cesena (1378).

His son, Carlo I Malatesta, one of the most respected condottieri of the time, enlarged the Riminese possessions and restored the port. Carlo died childless in 1429, and the lordship was divided into three parts, Rimini going to Galeotto Roberto Malatesta, a Catholic zealot inadequate for the position. 

The Pesarese line of the Malatestas tried, in fact, to take advantage of his weakness and to capture the city, but Sigismondo Pandolfo Malatesta, Carlo's nephew, who was only 14 at the time, intervened to save it. Galeotto retired to a convent, and Sigismondo obtained the rule of Rimini.

Sigismondo Pandolfo was the most famous lord of Rimini. In 1433, Sigismund, Holy Roman Emperor, sojourned in the city and for a while he was the commander-in-chief of the Papal armies. A skilled general, Sigismondo often acted as condottiero for other states to gain money to embellish it (he was also a dilettante poet). He had the famous Tempio Malatestiano rebuilt by Leon Battista Alberti. However, after the rise of Pope Pius II, he had to fight constantly for the independence of the city. 

In 1463, he was forced to submit to Pius II, who left him only Rimini and little more; Roberto Malatesta, his son (1482), under Pope Paul II, nearly lost his state, but under Pope Sixtus IV, became the commanding officer of the pontifical army against Ferdinand of Naples. Sigismondo was, however, defeated by Neapolitan forces in the battle of Campomorto (1482). Pandolfo IV, his son (1500), lost Rimini to Cesare Borgia, after whose overthrow it fell to Venice (1503–1509), but it was later retaken by Pope Julius II and incorporated into the Papal States. 

After the death of Pope Leo X, Pandolfo returned for several months, and with his son Sigismondo Malatesta held a rule which looked tyrannous even for the time. Pope Adrian VI expelled him again and gave Rimini to the Duke of Urbino, the pope's vicar in Romagna. 

In 1527, Sigismondo managed to regain the city, but in the following year the Malatesta dominion died forever.

Renaissance and Enlightenment 

At the beginning of the 16th century, Rimini, now a secondary town of the Papal States, was ruled by an Apostolic Legate. Towards the end of the 16th century, the municipal square (now Piazza Cavour), which had been closed off on a site where the Poletti Theatre was subsequently built, was redesigned. The statue of Pope Paul V has stood in the centre of the square next to the fountain since 1614.

In the 16th century, the 'grand square' (now the Piazza Tre Martiri in honor of three civilians hanged by the retreating Nazis at the end of World War II), which was where markets and tournaments were held, underwent various changes. A small temple dedicated to Saint Anthony of Padua and a clock tower were built there, giving the square its present shape and size.

Until the 18th century raiding armies, earthquakes, famines, floods and pirate attacks ravaged the city. In this gloomy situation and due to a weakened local economy, fishing took on great importance, a fact testified by the construction of structures such as the fish market and the lighthouse.

In 1797, Rimini, along with the rest of Romagna, was affected by the passage of the Napoleonic army and became part of the Cisalpine Republic. Napoleonic policy suppressed the monastic orders, confiscating their property and thus dispersing a substantial heritage, and demolished many churches including the ancient cathedral of Santa Colomba.

Modern history 

On 30 March 1815, Joachim Murat launched his Rimini Proclamation to the Italian people from here, hoping to incite them to unity and independence. In 1845, a band of adventurers commanded by Ribbotti entered the city and proclaimed a constitution which was soon abolished. In 1860, Rimini and Romagna were incorporated into the Kingdom of Italy.

The city was transformed after the 1843 founding of the first bathing establishment and the Kursaal, a building constructed to host sumptuous social events, became the symbol of Rimini's status as a tourist resort. 

In just a few years, the seafront underwent considerable development work making Rimini 'the city of small villas'. At the beginning of the 20th century, The Grand Hotel, the city's first major accommodation facility, was built near the beach.

During the first World War, Rimini and its surrounding infrastructure was one of the primary targets of the Austro-Hungarian Navy. After Italy's declaration of war on 15 May 1915, the Austro-Hungarian fleet left its harbours the same day and started its assault on the Adriatic coast between Venice and Barletta.

During World War II, the city was torn apart by heavy bombardments and by the passage of the front over the Gothic Line during the Battle of Rimini and was eventually captured by Greek and Canadian forces. Following its liberation on 21 September 1944, reconstruction work began, culminating in huge development of the tourist industry in the city.

Geography

Topography 

Rimini is situated at 44°03′00″ north and 12°34′00″ east, along the coast of the Adriatic sea, at the southeastern edge of Emilia-Romagna, at a short distance from Montefeltro and Marche. Rimini extends for 135.71 square km and borders the municipalities of Bellaria-Igea Marina, San Mauro Pascoli, and Santarcangelo di Romagna towards NW, Verucchio and Serravalle, San Marino towards SW, Coriano towards S, and Riccione towards SE. The city is also located at the intersection of three Roman roads: Via Emilia, Via Popilia, and Via Flaminia. Viserba is the most important of Rimini's northern districts, with 8,556 inhabitants.

Rimini is located in a historically strategic position, at the extreme southern edge of the Po Valley, at the junction point of Northern and Central Italy. It is surrounded towards southwest by the gently rolling hills of Covignano (153 metres high), Vergiano (81 m), San Martino Monte l'Abbate (57 m) and San Lorenzo in Correggiano (60 m), widely cultivated, with vineyards, olive groves and orchards, and dominated by ancient mansions. These hills, mostly made of clay and sand, connect the plains, created by the Marecchia and Ausa, the two most important rivers of Rimini territory, to the higher hills of the Apennines.

The Marecchia river runs through its valley and the plain in a very large riverbed and, after confluence with the Ausa, it flows into the Adriatic sea through a deviator between San Giuliano Mare and Rivabella, while the ancient riverbed is used in its last section as the city's harbour. The Marecchia, usually with little water flow, was subjected to periodic, destructive floods near its mouth, where the riverbed became narrow after various bends: for this reason it was deviated north.  Ausa creek, which was the eastern limit of Rimini for many centuries, was deviated as well after World War II, and its original riverbed was filled and turned into an urban park.

The coastal strip, made of recent marine deposits, is edged by a fine sandy beach, 15 km long and up to 200 metres wide, interrupted only by the mouth of the rivers and gently shelving towards the sea. Along the coastline there is a low sandy cliff, created by sea rise around 4000 B.C., partly conserved north of Rimini, between Rivabella and Bellaria-Igea Marina, at a distance of about 1,300 metres from the coast.

Rimini's territory, for its geographical position and its climatic features, is situated on the edge between the mediterranean and the central European phytoclimatic zones, and thus it represents an environment of notable naturalistic value.

Districts 
The conurbation has about 300,000 inhabitants and originated around the mid-20th century due to urban sprawl following intensive tourism development.

The city of Rimini includes the seaside localities and districts of Torre Pedrera, Viserbella, Viserba, Rivabella, San Giuliano Mare towards north and Bellariva, Marebello, Rivazzurra, Miramare towards south. These districts are important to tourism in Rimini.

The city proper includes the historic centre, the four ancient boroughs of S. Giuliano, S. Giovanni, S. Andrea and Marina, the seaside district of Marina Centro and various modern districts—Celle, Marecchiese, INA Casa, V PEEP, Colonnella, Lagomaggio—and outer suburbs such as Padulli, Spadarolo, Covignano, Grottarossa and Villaggio 1° Maggio, located outside of the Adriatic Highway beltline. More outer suburbs are S. Giustina, S. Vito, Spadarolo, Vergiano, Corpolò and Gaiofana.

The historic centre of Rimini, surrounded by the city walls built by Malatesta, and formerly bounded by the Marecchia and Ausa rivers, has a distinctive, regular urban structure of Roman origins. It was divided since the Middle Ages in four districts (Rioni): Cittadella, Clodio, Pomposo and Montecavallo. The boundaries of these districts are not known, but it is assumed that they followed the current Corso d'Augusto, Via Garibaldi, and Via Gambalunga. Additionally, the ancient coastline was situated much farther inland than today's; it gradually shifted outward over centuries and the new land was developed throughout the 20th century.

Rione Cittadella, in the western area of the centre, was the most important district of the city and included the Municipal palaces, Castel Sismondo and the Cathedral of Santa Colomba. Rione Clodio, towards the north, was popular and a peculiar urban structure tied with the near Marecchia river. Rione Pomposo, the widest district of the city, included large orchards and convents. Rione Montecavallo, on the southern part of the historical centre, is characterized by bowed, irregular streets of medieval origins, by the Fossa Patara creek and a small hill called "Montirone".

Outside of the city walls, there are four boroughs (Borghi), which were entirely incorporated to the city by the urban sprawl in the early 20th century.

Borgo S. Giuliano, along Via Emilia, dates back to the 11th century and was originally a fishermen's settlement. Dominated by the Church of San Giuliano, it is one of the most picturesque spots of the city, with narrow streets and squares, colourful small houses and many frescoes representing characters and places of Federico Fellini's films.

Borgo S. Giovanni, on both sides of Via Flaminia, was populated by artisans and middle-class; Borgo S. Andrea, located outside of Porta Montanara, along Via Covignano, Via Montefeltro and Via Monte Titano, was strictly tied with agriculture and commerce of cows. Both these two boroughs were developed in the 15th century; then they burned in a fire in 1469 and were rebuilt in the 19th century, relocating small industries and manufactures, including a brick factory and a phosphorus matches factory.

Borgo Marina, situated on the right bank of the Marecchia, was a portal borough, heavily transformed by Fascist demolitions and World War II bombings, which hit this area due to its proximity to the bridges and railway station of the city.

Climate 
Rimini has a humid subtropical climate (Köppen: Cfa) moderated by the influence of the Adriatic sea, featuring autumn and winter mean temperatures and annual low temperatures among the very highest in Emilia-Romagna.

Precipitations are equally distributed during the year, with a peak in October (75 mm) and two slight minimums, in January (42 mm) and July (43 mm). In spring, autumn and winter precipitations mainly come from oceanic fronts, while in summer they are brought by thunderstorms, coming from the Apennines or the Po Valley.

Humidity is high all year round, averaging a minimum of 72% in June and July and a maximum of 84% in November and December. Prevailing winds blow from W, S, E and NE. Southwesterly winds, known as libeccio or garbino, are foehn winds, which may bring warm temperatures in each season. On average, there are over 2,040 sunshine hours per year.

Demographics

Population
, Rimini has 150,951 inhabitants, with a density of about 1,100 inhabitants per square kilometre within the city limits.

In 1861, by the time of the first Italian census, the population was around 28,000; in 1931 it was more than double, 57,000.

With the increasing tourism development, population rapidly grew between 1951 and 1981, the fastest growing period for Rimini in the 20th century, when the city's population grew from 77,000 to over 128,000.

During the 20th century, two former districts of Rimini got administrative autonomy, causing two distinct temporary drops in population totals: Riccione in 1922 and Bellaria-Igea Marina in 1956.

Foreign population is 18,396, (12.5% of the total), mainly from Eastern Europe, East Asia and North Africa. Between 1992 and 2014, foreign population grew from around 1,800 to over 18,000 units. The most important foreign communities are Albanians (3,479), Romanians (2,904), Ukrainians (2,409), Chinese (1,197) and Moldovans (1,023). Other notable foreign groups in the city are Senegalese, Moroccans, Macedonians, Tunisians, Russians, Bangladeshis and Peruvians.

Religion
Rimini's population is mostly Catholic. The city is the seat of the Diocese of Rimini, a suffragan of the Archdiocese of Ravenna-Cervia.

The first cathedral of the diocese was the former Cathedral of Santa Colomba until 1798, when the title was transferred to the church of Sant'Agostino. Since 1809, Rimini's cathedral is the Tempio Malatestiano.

Besides Roman Catholic churches, there are also Orthodox, Evangelical and Adventist churches. Between the 13th and 14th century, Rimini had a flourishing Jewish community, which built three distinct synagogues, all destroyed, formerly located around the area of Piazza Cavour, Via Cairoli and Santa Colomba.

Government

Economy 

Rimini is a major international tourist destination and seaside resort, among the most well known in Europe and the Mediterranean basin, thanks to a long sandy beach, well-equipped bathing establishments, theme parks and a number of opportunities for leisure and spare time. The economy of the city is mainly based on tourism, whose development started in the first half of the 19th century and increased after World War II.

Rimini's origins as a seaside resort date back to 1843, when the first "Bathing Establishment" was founded, the oldest one of the Adriatic Sea. The width of the beach, the gentle gradient of the sea bed, the equipment of bathing establishments, the luxurious hotels, the mildness of the climate, the richness of curative waters, the prestigious social events, made Rimini a renowned tourist destination among the Italian and European aristocracy during the Belle Époque.

Tourism in Rimini started as therapeutic stay (thalassotherapy, hydrotherapy and heliotherapy), evolving into elite vacation in the late 19th century, into middle-class tourism during the fascist era and finally into mass tourism in the postwar period.

On summer nights, there is a festival called "La Notte Rosa".

Rimini concentrates about a quarter of Emilia-Romagna's hotels, with over 1,000 hotels, more than 220 of which are open all year round, aside from apartment hotels, apartments, holiday homes, bed & breakfast and campings. Tourism is mainly based on seaside holidays, but also includes trade fairs and conventions, events, nightlife, culture, wellness, food and wine. Rimini is a leading trade fair and convention site in Italy, with an important trade fair (Rimini Fiera) and a convention centre (Palacongressi di Rimini).

The city's other economic sectors, such as services, commerce, construction industry, have been influenced by the development of tourism. Commerce is one of the main economic sectors, thanks to the presence of a large wholesale center, two hypermarkets, department stores, supermarkets and hundreds of shops and boutiques. Industry, less developed than tourism and services, includes various companies active in food industry, woodworking machineries, building constructions, furnishing, clothing and publishing. Notable companies are Bimota (motorcycles), SCM (woodworking machines), Trevi S.p.A. (electronic goods). Rimini is also seat of a historic railway works plant.

Agriculture and fishing were the city's main economic sources until the early 20th century. The most common crops, in terms of surface area, are alfalfa, wheat, durum wheat, grape vine, olive tree, barley and sorghum. Among fruit trees dominates apricot, peach and plum trees. Important are the traditional productions of wine (Sangiovese, Trebbiano, Rebola, Pagadebit, Albana wines) and extra virgin olive oil. The fishing industry can count on a fleet of about 100 fishing boats, the most consistent of Rimini's fishing department, which includes the coast between Cattolica and Cesenatico.

Arts and culture

Museums 

The City Museum ("Museo della Città"), main museal institution of Rimini, was inaugurated as "Archaeology Gallery", at the ground floor of Palazzo Gambalunga in 1872, thanks to Riminese historian Luigi Tonini, active in researching and studying the local archaeological heritage. The Archaeology Gallery was the first museum of the city and was conceived as a collection of Etruscan civilization and Roman antiquities, found in Rimini and in the surrounding countryside.

The civic museum was arranged in San Francesco monastery in 1923 and in 1938 was enlarged with a section of Medieval Art. The objects avoided the destructions of World War II, being moved between 1940 and 1943 to two different shelters in Spadarolo and Novafeltria. In 1964, the collections were moved to Palazzo Visconti and finally, from 1990, to the Collegio dei Gesuiti, a large Jesuit convent designed by bolognese architect Alfonso Torreggiani, built in 1749.

In the Archaeological department are exhibited grave goods from Villanovian tombs of Verucchio and Covignano, architectural pieces, sculptures, mosaics, ceramics, coins of Republican and Imperial eras, and the exceptional medical kit from the Domus del Chirurgo. The collection of the Roman Lapidary, exhibited in the inner courtyard of the convent, has funerary monuments, epigraphies and milestones.

The Medieval and Modern Art departments include collections of paintings, sculptures and art objects by artists from Romagna (Giovanni da Rimini, Giuliano da Rimini, Guido Cagnacci), Emilia (Guercino, Vittorio Maria Bigari), Tuscany (Domenico Ghirlandaio, Agostino di Duccio) and Veneto (Giovanni Bellini), from 14th to 19th century. The City Museum arranges temporary exhibitions and promotes researches, study and restoration activities of the city's historical and artistic heritage.

The Fellini Museum (Museo Fellini), dedicated to Federico Fellini, houses temporary exhibitions of documents, drawings, scenographies and costumes related to the movie production of the film director.

The Museum of Glances (Museo degli Sguardi), housed in Villa Alvarado, on Covignano hill, was instituted in 2005 acquiring the objects of the former Museum of Extra European Cultures "Dinz Rialto", founded in Rimini in 1972 by explorer Delfino Dinz Rialto, the art pieces of the former Missionary Museum of the Grazie and other private collections. The museum has over 3,000 objects coming from China, Oceania, Africa and pre-Columbian America, with paintings, sculptures, everyday objects, totems, masks, musical instruments and clothes illustrating how the Western world has looked at these territories' cultures through history.

The Museum of Small Fishing and Marine (Museo della Piccola Pesca e della Marineria), in Viserbella, shows the history of Rimini's Marine through a collection of boats, fishing tools, photographs and a large seashells collection, with pieces from all over the Mediterranean Sea.

In the municipality of Rimini there are also two private museums: the Aviation Museum (Museo dell'Aviazione) in Sant'Aquilina, close to the boundary of the Republic of San Marino, and the National Museum of Motorcycle (Museo Nazionale del Motociclo) in Casalecchio.

Libraries 

The Gambalunghiana Library, historic institution founded in 1617 by jurist Alessandro Gambalunga, plays a leading role in the city's cultural life. The library has over 280,000 books, including 60,000 ancient books, 1,350 manuscripts, 6,000 prints and 80,000 photographs. Among the incunables, dated back from the 15th century, stand out De Claris mulieribus (1497) by Giacomo Filippo Foresti and De re militari by Roberto Valturio. The collection of illuminated manuscripts, coming from different cultural and linguistic European boundaries, includes the Regalis Historia by Frate Leonardo and De Civitate Dei by Saint Augustine.

Theatre and Films 

The first stable theatre in Rimini is documented since 1681, when the city council decided on the transformation of the Arengo's main hall into a large theatre hall, hosting shows of amateur dramatics companies and the young Carlo Goldoni, who was studying philosophy in the city at that time. Between 1842 and 1857 the great Municipal Theatre Vittorio Emanuele II was built, designed in Neoclassical style by the architect Luigi Poletti, according to the traditional canons of the 19th-century Italian theatre. The theatre was inaugurated by Giuseppe Verdi, who directed "L'Aroldo", and hosted prestigious opera seasons until its destruction in 1943 due to aerial bombings. Since 1947, it has been called Amintore Galli Theatre. Since its closure, theatre shows has been hosted in the modern Teatro Ermete Novelli in Marina Centro.

Rimini appeared on the movie screen for the first time in some early footages, such as the documentary "Rimini l'Ostenda d'Italia" (1912), and in various Istituto Luce's newsreels in the Thirties. The film director Federico Fellini, was born and raised in Rimini, portrayed characters, places and atmospheres of his hometown through his movies, which however were almost entirely shot in Cinecittà's studios in Rome: I Vitelloni, 8 e ½ (Oscar award in 1964), I clowns, Amarcord (Oscar award in 1975). Other Italian movies filmed in Rimini includes "La prima notte di quiete" by Valerio Zurlini, "Rimini Rimini" by Sergio Corbucci, "Abbronzatissimi" by Bruno Gaburro, "Sole negli occhi" by Andrea Porporati, "Da zero a dieci" by Luciano Ligabue and "Non pensarci" by Gianni Zanasi.

Music 
The earliest musician from Rimini was Saint Arduino (10th century); a musical tradition of some distinction was witnessed in the following century by the presence of a music school, named "Scuola cantorum", at the Cathedral of Santa Colomba. French composer Guillaume Dufay stayed in Rimini, at Malatesta's court until 1427. In 1518 Pietro Aaron became the first choirmaster of the Cathedral's chapel. In 1690 Carlo Tessarini, violinist and composer, was born in Rimini. The city also gave birth to the musician Benedetto Neri, professor at the Academy of Music in Milan.

Amintore Galli, illustrious musicologist and composer born in Talamello in 1845, attended the city's Classical Lyceum before moving to Milan, where he studied at the Academy of Music; in 1945 the Municipal Theatre of Rimini was dedicated to him.

Between the late 19th and early 20th centuries, many social events and dance parties took place at the Bathing Establishment, hosting celebrities such as soprano Elena Bianchini-Cappelli and tenor Enrico Caruso.

In recent years, the city inspired the homonymous music album by Fabrizio De André, released in 1978, and it is cited in various popular Italian and foreign songs by Fabrizio De André, Francesco Guccini, Nino Rota, Elvis Costello, Fred Buscaglione. Also born in Rimini were the songwriter Samuele Bersani and the composer and music producer Carlo Alberto Rossi, author of some of Mina's songs.

Cuisine 

Rimini's cuisine is simple and characterized by intense flavours and it is indissolubly related to the traditions of rural culture, influenced by the city's location—between the sea and the hills and near the border between Romagna and Marche.

The traditional first course is pasta, which includes regular pasta, pasta in broth and baked pasta, prepared in many different shapes. Almost all pasta dishes require a base of "sfoglia", a dough of eggs and flour, handmade with a rolling pin. First courses include cappelletti, passatelli in broth, lasagne, cannelloni, nidi di rondine, ravioli, tagliatelle, garganelli, maltagliati, gnocchi and strozzapreti, seasoned with bolognese sauce or a dressing of butter and sage.

Second courses include meat dishes, such as pollo alla cacciatora, rabbit in porchetta, meat-filled zucchini, sausages and mixed grilled meats, and fish dishes, like barbecues of atlantic mackerels, sardines, rotisseries of oily fishes, sepias with peas, fried squids and gianchetti (known here as "omini nudi").

Piada is a flatbread of ancient traditions, thin and crumbly, obtained from a dough of flour, water, lard and salt, and baked on a scorching "testo" of terracotta or cast iron. It is often accompanied by grilled meats or fishes, sausages, gratinée vegetables, salami, prosciutto, fresh cheeses and country herbs. Cassoni are stuffed flatbreads similar to piada, with various fillings: country herbs, potatoes and sausages, tomato and mozzarella. Side dishes include mixed salads, gratinée vegetables, roasted potatoes, sautée bladder campion leaves, marinated olives with dill, garlic and orange zest.

Traditional desserts are ciambella, Carnevale's fried fiocchetti and castagnole, piada dei morti (a doughnut with walnuts, raisins, pinenuts and almonds, prepared in November), zuppa inglese (a rich dessert with custard, savoiardi and liqueurs), caramelized figs, peaches in white wine and strawberries in red wine.

Typical local products are squacquerone (a fresh cheese) and saba, a grape syrup used to prepare desserts. Quality extra virgin olive oil is traditionally produced in Rimini area since ancient times.
The wines include Sangiovese, Trebbiano, Pagadebit, Rebola, Cabernet Sauvignon and Albana, a dessert wine of Roman origins.

Cityscape

Architecture 
Rimini has a varied historical and artistic heritage which includes churches and monasteries, villas and palaces, fortifications, archaeological sites, streets and squares, as a result of the succession of various civilizations, dominations and historical events through its history, from the Romans to the Byzantines, the medieval comune, the Malatesta seignory, the Venetian Republic and the Papal States dominations.

The city has always been a key gate to the Orient and the southern areas of the Mediterranean for the Po Valley, thanks to its geographical position and its harbour, and a meeting point between cultures of Northern and Central Italy.

Rimini has monuments of different eras, with important examples of architecture from the Roman age, such as the Arch of Augustus, the Tiberius Bridge, the Amphitheatre and the Domus del Chirurgo; from the Middle Ages, such as the Palazzo dell'Arengo, the church of Sant'Agostino and Castel Sismondo; from the Renaissance, with the Tempio Malatestiano, masterpiece of Leon Battista Alberti.

Rimini's archaeological heritage includes some domus of Republican and Imperial age, characterized by polychrome or black and white mosaics, necropolis and sections of the pavement of the ancient Roman streets. The city, along with its boroughs and the seaside district of Marina Centro, also preserves buildings from the Baroque, the Neoclassical and Art Nouveau periods, with churches, palaces, hotels and mansions which reveal its role of cultural and trading centre and seaside resort.

The city centre has a Roman structure, partly modified by following medieval transformations. Urban evolution, through the renovation of the Malatesta, earthquakes and the suppressions of monasteries, has led to a stratification of historic sites and buildings. The bombings of World War II caused extensive destruction and damage, compromising the monumental heritage and the integrity of the city centre, which has been reconstructed and restored in order to valorize its historic places and buildings.

Main sights

Religious buildings 
 Tempio Malatestiano: the original gothic-style cathedral of San Francesco was built in the 13th century, but reconstructed into a Renaissance masterwork by the Florentine architect Leon Battista Alberti, commissioned by Sigismondo Pandolfo Malatesta, hence the name. In the cathedral are the tombs of Sigismondo and his wife Isotta.
 Bell tower of the former Cathedral of Santa Colomba.
 Sant'Agostino: 13th-century Romanesque church.
 Chiesa dei Teatini: 17th-century Baroque-style church.
 San Fortunato: this 1418 church houses the Adoration of the Magi painting (1547) by Giorgio Vasari.
 San Giovanni Battista: 12th-century church with single nave with rich stucco decoration from the 18th century.
 San Giuliano Martire: 1553–1575 church houses ta painting by Paul Veronese (1588) depicting the martyrdom of that saint. The church also houses the polyptych (1409) by Bittino da Faenza (1357–1427) depicting episodes of this saint's life.
 Santa Maria dei Servi: Church built in 1317 by the religious order of the Servants of Mary and entirely transformed in 1779 by architect Gaetano Stegani, which was buried here. The façade was completed in 1894 by Giuseppe Urbani. The interior has a single nave, adorned with coupled columns on each side and rich Baroque plasters.
 Church of Suffragio: situated in Piazza Ferrari, was constructed by the Jesuites in 1721, designed by Giovan Francesco Buonamici. It features an unfinished brick façade. The interior, shaped in the form of the Latin Cross, has a single nave flanked by chapels and adorned by plain Baroque decorations and paintings by Guido Cagnacci.
 Tempietto of Sant'Antonio.
 Madonna della Scala.

Secular buildings 
 Castel Sismondo or Rocca Malatestiana: this castle built by Sigismondo Pandolfo was later used as a prison.
 Grand Hotel: the Grand Hotel was built in Art Nouveau style by Swiss architect Paolito Somazzi between 1906 and 1908 and protected as "National monument" in 1994. The building is fronted by a wide elevated terrace and it has two central towers which were originally topped by moorish domes, with rich floreal decorations. The hotel has 117 bedrooms, a large atrium, a restaurant and several living rooms, ornamented by ancient furnitures and 18th-century Venetian chandeliers. The hotel hosted many illustrious people, sovereigns, nobles and exponents of the European bourgeoisie.
 Palazzo dell'Arengo e del Podestà (1204): this building was the seat of the judiciary and civil administrations. On the short side, in the 14th century, the podestà residence was added. It was modified at the end of the 16th century.
 Palazzo Garampi.
 Amintore Galli Theatre: this theater was originally dedicated to king Victor Emmanuel II and then renamed for the musician Amintore Galli; it was designed by architect Luigi Poletti. It was inaugurated in 1857 with an opera by Giuseppe Verdi (Aroldo). The theatre was bombed during World War II. Many projects were started to restore it; it reopened in 2019.
 Villa Des Vergers: it is the largest riminese villa, situated on the hills of San Lorenzo in Correggiano, about 6 km from the city centre. The villa was built in the 17th century for want of the Diotallevi family; in 1843 it was purchased by French historian and archaeologist Adolphe Noël des Vergers and entirely renovated between 1880 and 1890 by architect Arthur-Stanislas Diet. The palace is a typical example of Napoleon III Eclectic architecture, with a main building fronted by a pronaos and flanked by two lateral wings, and internal halls characterized by Neoclassical furnitures and decorations. The villa is surrounded by a 6 hectares park, which includes a water parterre, a formal giardino all'italiana and a landscape garden, with groups of evergreen oaks, pines and cypresses which frame the palace in scenographic perspectives.

Monuments 
Merlons were added in the Middle Ages. It was restored in the 18th century by Tommaso Temanza.
 Fontana della Pigna.
 Fontana dei Quattro Cavalli: The fountain is one of the symbols of Rimini as a seaside resort, built in 1928 by riminese sculptor Filogenio Fabbri. Demolished in 1954, was accurately reconstructed in 1983, recomposing the original parts. The fountain features a large circular basin, overlooked by four marine horses which sustain the superior basin.
 Monument to Pope Paul V.
Tiberius Bridge: This bridge on the river Marecchia was begun under Emperor Augustus in 14 AD, as the inscription on the internal parapets recalls, and completed under Tiberius in 21. The bridge still connects the city centre to Borgo San Giuliano and leads to the consular roads Via Emilia and Via Popilia that lead north. Built in Istria stone, the bridge consists of five arches that rest on massive pillars with breakwater spurs set at an oblique angle with respect to the bridge's axis in order to follow the current. The bridge's structure, on the other hand, rests on a practical system of wooden poles.
 Torre dell'Orologio: The Clock tower was built in 1547 in Piazza Tre Martiri, replacing the ancient "beccherie" (public butcher's), and reconstructed in 1759 by Giovan Francesco Buonamici. In 1875, the top of the tower was ruined due to an earthquake, and it was restored in 1933. The clock, which dates back to 1562, overlooks a perpetual calendar assembled in 1750, decorated by terracotta panels depicting zodiacal signs, months and lunar phases. The central, blind arch of the porch houses the memorial of the victims of World War II.

Archaeological sites 
 Roman amphitheater (2nd century): The amphitheater was erected alongside the ancient coast line, and had two orders of porticoes with 60 arcades. The arena measured , not much smaller than the greatest Roman amphitheatres: the edifice could house up to 15,000 spectators.

Parks and recreation 
Rimini has an extensive parks system, with 1.3 million square metres of parks and gardens inside the urban area and a total of 2.8 million square metres of green areas inside the city limits, including river parks, sport facilities and natural areas.

The city's park system includes a series of large urban parks, created along the old riverbeds of Marecchia and Ausa, neighbourhood parks and gardens and tree-lined boulevards. 

The main parks of the city are XXV Aprile Park, Giovanni Paolo II Park, Alcide Cervi Park, Fabbri Park, Ghirlandetta Park, Federico Fellini Park, Pertini Park in Marebello and Briolini Park in San Giuliano Mare. Every Saturday, XXV Aprile Park hosts one of the Italy's thirteen (as of 2022) parkruns.

In Rimini there are about 42,000 public trees, belonging to 190 different species, predominantly linden, planes, maples, poplars, pines and oaks. 23 of these are old trees, protected as "monumental trees" for their age and their naturalistic value, such as the plane of piazza Malatesta, the downy oak of Giovanni Paolo II Park, the cypresses of Sant'Agostino, the elm of Viale Vespucci and the linden trees of San Fortunato.

The city's cycling network is articulated inside the main parks and boulevards, linking the most important monuments, tourist attractions, beaches, meeting places, offering various opportunities to different use categories, including urban travels, mountain bike and cyclotourism.

The urban cycling network is connected, through XXV Aprile Park, to the cycle route which links Rimini and Saiano, along the river Marecchia.

Education 
Rimini is the seat of a Campus of University of Bologna, attended by 5,800 students, which include bachelors and masters belonging to eight Faculties: Economics, Statistical Sciences, Pharmacy, Literature and Philosophy, Industrial Chemistry, Sport Sciences, Medicine and Surgery.
The city has public schools of all levels, including 13 nurseries, 12 kindergartens, 39 primary schools, 5 secondary schools and 11 high schools (4 Lyceums, 3 Technical Institutes, 3 Professional Institutes and an Institute of Musical Studies). The most ancient city's Lyceum, the Classical Lyceum "Giulio Cesare", founded in 1800, was attended by Giovanni Pascoli and Federico Fellini.

Infrastructure

Transportation 
Rimini is an important road and railway junction, thanks to its position at the intersection between the Adriatic coastal routes and the Po Valley ones and its proximity to the Republic of San Marino.

Roads 
The Adriatic motorway (A14) connects Rimini to Bologna towards north and Taranto towards south, through the tolls of Rimini Nord and Rimini Sud. Rimini is a junction of three highways of Roman origins: the Via Emilia (SS 9) to Milan, the Via Flaminia (SS 16) to Rome and the Via Popilia (SS 16) to Padova.

The Rimini–San Marino Highway (SS 72) connects the Adriatic Riviera to the capital of the Republic of San Marino, entering the Sammarinese territory after the State limit at Dogana.

Via Marecchiese (SP 258), leading to Sansepolcro, passes through the Apennines at Viamaggio Pass and links Rimini to its hinterland, Tuscany and the Tiber Valley. Roads of local importance are the provincial roads to Coriano (SP 31), Montescudo (SP 41) and Santa Cristina (SP 69).

Railways 
Rimini is a major junction of the regional railway network and it is one of the main stations of the Adriatic railway. Rimini Station is a junction of the railroad lines Bologna-Ancona and Ferrara-Ravenna-Rimini, and trains of all categories stop there, including Frecciarossa and Frecciabianca. It is also the ending point of long-distance railway services to Rome and of regional services to Bologna, Castelbolognese, Ancona and Ravenna.

Rimini also has four minor railway stations: Miramare, Viserba, Torre Pedrera, served by regional services, and Rimini Fiera, periodically served by regional and intercity services in conjunction with the main trade fairs.

Airways 
The city is served by the Federico Fellini International Airport, at Miramare, the second largest airport in Emilia-Romagna by passenger traffic. It has regular links to national and international hubs, low cost, charter and seasonal flights.

The closest major international airports are Bologna-Marconi, Venice-Marco Polo and Milan-Malpensa.

Urban transport 
The network of urban transport, operated by START Romagna, includes 13 urban bus lines, nine suburban bus lines, as well as two lines connecting Rimini city centre with the nearby seaside resort of Riccione: a trolleybus line and since November 2019, the Metromare bus rapid transit line.

Utilities 
Rimini is served by the wastewater treatment plant of Rimini-Santa Giustina.
To prevent most of the temporary sea bathing prohibitions occurring when wastewater is discharged into the sea in case of heavy rainfall or thunderstorms, in 2013 extensive work began to upgrade the sewage system, which is expected to be completed in 2024. The works done between 2013 and 2020 made it possible to eliminate nearly all temporary sea bathing prohibitions in Marina Centro, Viserba, in the southern parts of Viserbella and in the northern parts of both Rivabella and Torre Pedrera, in addition to coastal areas that were already not affected, such as northern Marina Centro, southern Bellariva, Marebello, northern Rivazzurra and central Torre Pedrera.

Waste management is operated by the multi-utility company Hera Group. Waste sorting attained 71,8% in 2020.

Sports 

The main football team of the city is Rimini Calcio. It played for nine years (between 1976 and 2009) in Serie B, the second-highest division in the Italian football league system. Its better positioning was the fifth place of the 2006–07 season (when Rimini was also undefeated in both games against Juventus).

Rimini has also a notable basketball team, the Basket Rimini Crabs, which played for several years in Serie A and two times in the European Korać Cup. About baseball, Rimini Baseball Club won 12 national championships and it was also European champion three times.

Rimini is the site of the annual Paganello event, one of the world's premier Beach Ultimate tournaments.

Notable natives of Rimini and environs 

 Ancient Bards (founded 2006), symphonic metal band
 Enea Bastianini (born 1997), motorcycle racer
 Marco Battagli (died 1370/76), historian
 Samuele Bersani (born 1970), singer/songwriter
 Marco Bezzecchi (born 1998), motorcycle racer
 Pier Paolo Bianchi (born 1952), Grand Prix motorcycle road racer
 Rosetta Boninsegna (1926–1972), painter
 Matteo Brighi (born 1981), football player
 Claudio Maria Celli (born 1941), titular archbishop
 Gregorio Celli (1225–1343), Roman Catholic priest, professed member of the Order of Saint Augustine, beatified by Pope Clement XIV on 6 September 1769
 Roberto Paci Dalò (born 1962), composer, director and visual artist
 Patrizia Deitos (born 1975), supermodel and singer
 Victoria de Stefano (1940–2023), novelist, essayist, philosopher and educator
 Mattia Drudi (born 1998), racing driver
 Federico Fellini (1920–1993), film director
 Alberto Marvelli (1918–1946), engineer, president of Azione Cattolica
 Carlton Myers (born 1971), basketball player
 Elio Pagliarani (1927–2012), poet and literary critic
 Renzo Pasolini (1938–1973), Grand Prix motorcycle road racer
 Alessandra Perilli (born 1988), shooter and first Olympic medalist for San Marino
 Hugo Pratt (1927–1995), comic book creator
 Giuliano da Rimini (c. 1307 – c. 1324), painter
 Michael Ruben Rinaldi (born 1995), motorcycle racer
 Delio Rossi (born 1960), football manager
 Loris Stecca (born 1960), former world champion boxer
 Massimo Tamburini (1943–2014), motorcycle designer
 Giovanni Urbinati (born 1946), ceramist and sculptor
 Roberto Valturio (1405–1475), engineer and writer
 Renato Zangheri (1925–2015), mayor of the city of Bologna from 1970 to 1983, historical and Italian scholar
 Carlotta Montanari (born 1981), actress and former TV host

Twin towns — sister cities

Rimini is twinned with:

 Fort Lauderdale, United States
 Saint-Maur-des-Fossés, France
 Seraing, Belgium
 Sochi, Russia
 Yangzhou, China
 Ziguinchor, Senegal

See also 

 Roman Catholic Diocese of Rimini
 Battle of Rimini (1944)
 The Grand Hotel Rimini
 Rimini Calcio Football Club
 Rimini Lighthouse

Bibliography

References

Sources and external links

 Province of Rimini
 Rimini Comune (Town Council)
 Official Tourist Information site of Rimini (Town Council)
 Rimini
 Rimini Travel Guide in Dutch

 
260s BC establishments
268 BC
Populated places established in the 3rd century BC
3rd-century BC establishments in Italy
Cities and towns in Emilia-Romagna
Duchy of the Pentapolis
Papal States
Roman amphitheatres in Italy
Roman sites of Emilia-Romagna
Seaside resorts in Italy